Pascal Colomer (born 30 August 1974) is a Chilean sports shooter. He competed in the men's skeet event at the 1996 Summer Olympics.

References

External links
 

1974 births
Living people
Chilean male sport shooters
Olympic shooters of Chile
Shooters at the 1996 Summer Olympics
Place of birth missing (living people)
20th-century Chilean people